Shumki is a rural locality (a village) in Kultayevskoye Rural Settlement, Permsky District, Perm Krai, Russia. The population was 60 as of 2010. There are 4 streets.

Geography 
Shumki is located 22 km southwest of Perm (the district's administrative centre) by road. Kichanovo is the nearest rural locality.

References 

Rural localities in Permsky District